Razi or al-Razi is a name that was historically used to indicate a person coming from Ray, Iran.

People 
It most commonly refers to:
 Muhammad ibn Zakariya al-Razi (865–925), influential physician, alchemist and philosopher, also known by his Latinized name Rhazes or Rasis
 Abu Hatim Ahmad ibn Hamdan al-Razi (died c. 934), Isma'ili philosopher
 Fakhr al-Din al-Razi (1150–1210), influential polymath and theologian

It may also refer to:
 Shapur of Rey, also known as Sabur al-Razi, Sasanian military officer from the Mihran family, Marzban of Persian Armenia 483–4
 Mihran Razi (died 637), military officer from the Mihran family
 Abu Zur’a al-Razi (died 878), Sunni hadith scholar
 Abu Hatim Muhammad ibn Idris al-Razi (811–890), Sunni hadith scholar
 Muhammad ibn Ya'qub al-Kulayni al-Razi (864–941), Shia compiler of hadith
 Aḥmad ibn Muḥammad ibn Mūsa al-Rāzī (888–955), historian 
 ʿĪsā al-Rāzī (died 980), historian
 Najm al-Din Razi, 13th-century Sufi
 Amin Razi, 16th-century geographer

Locations 
 Razi University, a public university in the city of Kermanshah
 Razi, Ardabil, a city
 Razi, Golestan, a village
 Razi, Khuzestan, a village 
 Razi, West Azerbaijan, a village
 Seyyed Razi, Iran, a village

Politics 
 Razi is a short word for a supporter of Rashism